Plebejus anna, or Anna's blue, is a species of blue in the butterfly family Lycaenidae. It is found in North America.

The MONA or Hodges number for Plebejus anna is 4374.1.

Subspecies
These six subspecies belong to the species Plebejus anna:
 Plebejus anna anna (W. H. Edwards, 1861)
 Plebejus anna azureus (J. Emmel, T. Emmel & Mattoon in T. Emmel, 1998)
 Plebejus anna benwarner Scott, 2006
 Plebejus anna lotis (Lintner, 1878)
 Plebejus anna ricei Cross, 1937
 Plebejus anna vancouverensis (C. Guppy & J. Shepard, 2001)

References

Further reading

External links

 

Plebejus
Butterflies described in 1861
Butterflies of North America
Taxa named by William Henry Edwards
Articles created by Qbugbot